Kodak Retinette is the name of a classic series of cameras manufactured by the Eastman Kodak company. They were introduced in 1939 as a less expensive alternative to the Kodak Retina series. The first models were of the folding type using bellows and their lenses had three elements as compared to the four element Tessar lenses ( meaning four) of the Retina series. The first non-folding (rigid) variant was introduced in 1954 with the model 022. They most often featured Schneider Kreuznach Reomar lenses but, sometimes, Rodenstock Reomar lenses were installed. The Rodenstock lenses were based on the original Schneider Kreuznach triplet (three optical element) design. Kodak Anastigmat Angénieux lenses were also used especially for the French market. Common shutters included Compur–Rapid as well as various Pronto, Vero and Kodak models.

Models 
.

Citations and notes

External links 

Retinette 022 through Internet Archive
Retinette IB from Camerapedia through Internet Archive
Retinette 1B
Kodak Retinette 1A from Camerapedia through Internet Archive
Kodak Classics by Mischa Koning

Kodak cameras
135 film cameras